Fromme is a surname. People with this surname include:

Alex M. Fromme (1915–1982), Justice of the Kansas Supreme Court
Allan Fromme (1916–2003) was an American psychologist, teacher, and writer
Art Fromme (1883–1956), professional baseball pitcher
Lynette Fromme (born 1948), American criminal and member of the Manson family who attempted to assassinate Gerald Ford

See also
Mount Fromme, a mountain on the North Shore of Vancouver, British Columbia
From (disambiguation)
Fromm
 Frum (Yiddish form)
 Frum (surname)